Leschenault may refer to:
 Jean-Baptiste Leschenault de La Tour (1773–1826), French botanist and ornithologist
 Leschenault, Western Australia, an outer suburb of Bunbury
 Leschenault Estuary, an estuarine lagoon to the north of Bunbury, Western Australia
 Leschenault, a former name of the Electoral district of Mitchell (Western Australia)

See also 
 Leschenault's leaf-toed gecko
 Leschenault's rousette
 Lechenaultia